Humberto Hernandez Jr. (born June 14, 1962) was a City of Miami Commissioner and attorney.

Hernandez, the son of a Bay of Pigs Invasion veteran, was a graduate of Belen Jesuit Preparatory School in Miami in 1980.

In 1995, Hernandez ran for the City of Miami Commission. He lost the runoff election by 55 votes and challenged the election.  He lost his challenge the eventual winner was Joe Carollo. 

In 1996, a special election was called to fill the position of Mayor of Miami because of the death of Mayor Stephen P. Clark. Joe Carollo resigned his seat to run for mayor and Hernandez decided to run for the Commission again. He lost that election to Tomas Regalado.

In 1997, Commissioner Miller Dawkins resigned his seat and Rev. Richard Dunn was appointed to hold the seat until a new election was called. Hernandez then ran for that position against Rev. Dunn and won that seat and for the first time in 31 years the city of Miami had no “black” commissioner.  One of the things promised by Hernandez if he was elected was to replace “at-large” commission seats with “single member” commission seats. The following year, Florida Governor Lawton Chiles suspended Hernandez from the City of Miami Commission because Hernandez was indicted for money laundering and bank fraud. Thelma Gibson, the wife of Theodore Gibson (the first black elected commissioner for the City of Miami),  was appointed to fill his seat on the commission.

In 1998, Hernandez ran again for a seat on the City of Miami Commission claiming he was innocent of the federal charges.  He won that election with 65.42% of the vote .  Yet a few months later he was again suspended from office by Governor Chiles because he was arrested for election fraud.  In his trial for the election fraud the court acquitted Hernandez of a felony count of fabricating evidence and a misdemeanor count of conspiracy to fabricate evidence. He was convicted of being an accessory after the fact. He was sentenced to 364 days in prison.  He was replaced by Joe Sanchez on the commission. During this time it was revealed that his attorney, Jose Manuel Quinon, was having an affair with his wife of 8 years, Esther M. Ortiz.  He tried to have the courts give him a new trial based on the affair but was unsuccessful.  He and his wife finally divorced in 1999 (in 2003 Ortiz married Quinon).    Hernandez was disbarred by the Florida Supreme Court but is eligible to reapply in 2008.

References

 The Miami Herald, HERNANDEZ ADMITS HE PLAYED KEY ROLE IN BANK-FRAUD SCAM, August 28, 1998
 The Miami Herald, TWO LAWYERS RECOGNIZED FOR FREE WORK IN LITTLE HAVANA,  February 12, 1995
 The Miami Herald, WHO'S RUNNING, September 24, 1995
 The Miami Herald, FOR 3 CANDIDATES, HOME IS WHERE THE VOTES ARE THEY RECENTLY BECAME CITY RESIDENTS, October 25, 1995 * The Miami Herald, CANDIDATE UNDER INVESTIGATION, October 27, 1995
 The Miami Herald, On Reconsideration : Carollo,  November 4, 1995
 The Miami Herald, 3RD-PLACE CANDIDATE MAY CHALLENGE RESULTS, November 10, 1995
 The Miami Herald, JUDGE ASKED TO POSTPONE RUNOFF, November 13, 1995
 The Miami Herald, SIX WILL RUN FOR CAROLLO'S OLD CITY COMMISSION SEAT,  August 13, 1996
 The Miami Herald, HERNANDEZ: TRUST ME—DESPITE STATE, FEDERAL PROBES,  August 25, 1996
 The Miami Herald, MIAMI COMMISSION CANDIDATES, November 3, 1996
 The Miami Herald, DUNN IN RUNOFF WITH HERNANDEZ, November 6, 1996
 The Miami Herald, ACTIVISTS: WHY PROBE OF MIAMI COMMISSION CANDIDATE?,  November 13, 1996
 The Miami Herald, COMMISSION ELECTION MAY END AT-LARGE VOTING,  November 14, 1996
 The Miami Herald, MIAMI'S ONLY BLACK COMMISSIONER IN TOUGH BATTLE,  November 15, 1996
 The Miami Herald, CITY DISTRICTING IS LIKELY, WHETHER BY VOTE OR LAWSUIT,  November 15, 1996
 The Miami Herald, The BANK FRAUD PROBE TARGETS CITY OFFICIAL HERNANDEZ LAWYER: NO WRONG DONE,  February 21, 1997
 The Miami Herald, COMMISSIONER'S TAKING THE FIFTH EXPLAINS IT ALL,  February 23, 1997
 The Miami Herald, OFFICIAL'S BRICKELL CONDO LOAN PROBED,  March 15, 1997
 The Miami Herald, MIAMI ROCKED ANEW,  July 30, 1997
 The Miami Herald, BLACK LEADERS LOBBY TO GAIN HERNANDEZ SEAT MIAMI MAY HOLD SPECIAL ELECTION, July 30, 1997
 The Florida Times-Union,  Miami commissioner snared in money laundering probe, July 30, 1997
 The St. Petersburg Times, Bank fraud probe nets Miami city commissioner,  July 30, 1997
 The Tampa Tribune,  Miami official indicted in fraud probe,  July 30, 1997
 The Miami Herald, GIBSON TAKES CITY SEAT FOR A SHORT TERM,  August 9, 1997
 The Miami Herald, SUSPENDED MIAMI COMMISSIONER PLEADS NOT GUILTY IN FRAUD CASE,  August 28, 1997
 The Miami Herald, NAMES AND REPUTATIONS AT ISSUE IN MIAMI RACE,  October 16, 1997
 The Miami Herald, TEELE WINS MIAMI SEAT HERNANDEZ, GORT RETURN TO COMMISSION, November 5, 1997
 The Miami Herald, COAST IS CLEAR FOR HERNANDEZ'S RETURN CHILES WON'T BLOCK INDICTED MIAMI COMMISSIONER'S ELECTION, November 6, 1997
 The Miami Herald, VOTE FRAUD PROBE TARGETS SUAREZ ALLY,  March 14, 1998
 The Miami Herald, FOR HERNANDEZ, A REVERSAL OF FORTUNE, March 15, 1998
 The Miami Herald, HERNANDEZ INDICTED COMMISSIONER, ALLIES TO SURRENDER ON VOTE-FRAUD CHARGES, May 28, 1998 * The Miami Herald, CHILES SUSPENDS HERNANDEZ, May 29, 1998
 The Miami Herald, EX-POLICEMAN NAMED CITY COMMISSIONER,  June 6, 1998
 The Miami Herald, HERNANDEZ IS SENT TO PRISON BOND REVOKED, June 9, 1998
 Tallahassee Democrat,  COMMISSIONER RACKING UP FRAUD CHARGES \ HUMBERTO HERNANDEZ WAS JAILED FOR FABRICATING EVIDENCE REGARDING ABSENTEE-VOTER FRAUD WHILE ALREADY CHARGED WITH MORTGAGE FRAUD,  June 9, 1998
 The Palm Beach Post, CONVICTED MIAMI CITY COMMISSIONER REMOVED FROM OFFICE,  August 18, 1998
 The Miami Herald, EX-MIAMI OFFICIAL ADMITS TO SCAM ANOTHER BLOW FOR HERNANDEZ,  August 28, 1998
 The Miami Herald, A LUMINOUS STAR, DULLED,  August 29, 1998
The Miami Herald, HERNANDEZ ATTORNEY REMOVED FROM CASE,  October 22, 1998
 The Miami Herald, HERNANDEZ'S WIFE ADMITS TO AFFAIR DOESN'T REGRET LIAISON WITH HUSBAND'S LAWYER, October 24, 1998
 The Miami Herald, EX-COMMISSIONER GETS 4 YEARS, HUGE FINE FOR BANK FRAUD,  May 14, 1999
 El Nuevo Herald,  YA ES FINAL EL DIVORCIO DE HUMBERTO HERNÁNDEZ,  September 30, 1999
 The Miami Herald, JAILED FORMER COMMISSIONER IS DISBARRED,  March 23, 2001
 The Miami Herald,  JAILED EX-COMMISSIONER WILL REQUEST RELEASE, December 5, 2001
 The Miami Herald, JUDGE DENIES RELEASE OF EX-COMMISSIONER,  December 6, 2001
 The Miami Herald,  LAWYER'S AFFAIR MAY SPRING JAILED EX-COMMISSIONER,  February 5, 2002
 St. Petersburg Times,  Conviction stands despite lawyer's affair,  May 10, 2002

1962 births
Living people
American people of Cuban descent
Florida city council members